Magna Carta Island is an ait in the River Thames in England, on the reach above Bell Weir Lock. It is in Berkshire facing water-meadows forming Runnymede. Its civil and ecclesiastical parish is Wraysbury so it was transferred from Buckinghamshire to Berkshire in 1974.

History

The island is a contender for being the place where, in 1215, King John sealed Magna Carta. Whilst the charter itself indicates Runnymede by name, it is possible the island may have been considered part of Runnymede at the time.   It is known that in 1217 the island was the meeting-place of Henry III and Louis (later Louis VIII) of France.

In the early 1920s it was owned by a stockbroker, J. F. MacGregor, and his wife, the music hall performer Maidie Scott.   In August 2014 Forbes reported that the island would be sold by Sotheby's International Realty.

See also
Islands in the River Thames

References

Islands of Berkshire
History of Buckinghamshire
Islands of the River Thames
Magna Carta
Royal Borough of Windsor and Maidenhead